Vasilis Anastopoulos (born 20 December 1975) is a Greek former cyclist and a cyclist trainer. Since 2019 he works for Quick-Step Cycling Team, training Mark Cavendish among others.

Major results

1995
1st Stage 2 Tour of Rhodes
3rd National Road Race Championships
1997
1st Stage 7 Tour of Turkey
1998
1st Stage 9 Tour of Greece
1st Stage 1 Tour of Yugoslavia
2000
1st  National Road Race Championships
2001
1st  National Road Race Championships
1st  National Time Trial Championships
2002
1st Balkan Road Race Championships
1st Stage 3 Tour of Rhodes
1st Stages 3 & 6 Tour of Greece
2nd  National Time Trial Championships
2003
1st Overall Tour of Greece
1st Stage 2
2nd National Time Trial Championships
2004
1st  National Road Race Championships
2nd National Time Trial Championships
2005
1st  National Road Race Championships
3rd National Time Trial Championships
2006
3rd National Road Race Championships
2007
3rd National Time Trial Championships
2009
2nd National Time Trial Championships
3rd National Road Race Championships

References

1975 births
Living people
Greek male cyclists
People from Megalopoli, Greece
Sportspeople from the Peloponnese
21st-century Greek people